Tadikonda mandal is one of the 57 mandals in Guntur district of the Indian state of Andhra Pradesh. The mandal is under the administration of Guntur revenue division and the headquarters are located at Tadikonda.

Demographics 
 census, the mandal had a population of  67,960. The total population constitute, 33,655 males and 34,305 females —a sex ratio of 1019 females per 1000 males. 6,683 children are in the age group of 0–6 years.

Towns and villages 
 census, the mandal has 12 villages.
The settlements in the mandal are listed below:

Administration 
The mandal forms a part of the Andhra Pradesh Capital Region under the jurisdiction of APCRDA. It is under the control of a tahsildar and the present tahsildar is G. Anil Kumar 
Tadikonda mandal is one of the 5 mandals under Assembly constituency, which in turn represents Tadikona Assembly of Andhra Pradesh.

Education 

The mandal plays a major role in education for the rural students of the nearby villages. The primary and secondary school education is imparted by government, aided and private schools, under the School Education Department of the state. As per the school information report for the academic year 2015–16, the mandal has more than 7,592 students enrolled in over 63 schools.

Transport
Buses are available at regular timings between Guntur and Tadikonda.

See also 
 List of mandals in Andhra Pradesh
 Villages in Tadikonda mandal

References

External links 

Mandals in Guntur district